Judge Nathan S. Roberts House is a historic home located at Canastota in Madison County, New York.  It was built about 1820 and is a distinguished example of the Federal style.  It is the oldest surviving building in Canastota.

It was added to the National Register of Historic Places in 1986.

References

External links

Houses on the National Register of Historic Places in New York (state)
Historic American Buildings Survey in New York (state)
Federal architecture in New York (state)
Houses completed in 1820
Houses in Madison County, New York
National Register of Historic Places in Madison County, New York